Gianluca de Castro Petecof (born 14 November 2002) is a Brazilian racing driver. He currently competes full-time in the Brazilian Stock Car Pro Series, driving the No. 101 Toyota Corolla E210 for Full Time Sports.  He was champion of the Formula Regional European Championship in 2020, and has competed in the FIA Formula 2 Championship with Campos Racing.

Career

Karting
Born in São Paulo, Petecof started his karting career in 2010. After multiple karting titles in Brazil, Petecof moved over to Europe to compete on an international level. His best result was fifth in the CIK-Karting World Championship in 2016.

Lower formulas 
In 2018 Petecof made his single-seater racing debut in the Italian and ADAC Formula 4 Championships. The former would be more successful for Petecof, with one win and four further podiums helping him to fifth in the standings, meanwhile the Brazilian only scored one podium in ADAC F4 on his way to tenth.

The next year Petecof continued racing in both Italy and Germany. He won four races and became vice-champion in the Italian series, 136 points behind Dennis Hauger. In ADAC F4 Petecof achieved one victory and finished 5th.

Formula Regional European Championship

In 2020 Prema Powerteam announced that Petecof would drive for them in the Formula Regional European Championship alongside Jamie Chadwick, Oliver Rasmussen and fellow Ferrari Academy member Arthur Leclerc. Petecof started the season strongly, amassing four victories in the first three rounds. Despite his strong start to the season, Leclerc was able to keep the championship battle going until the last race of the season at Vallelunga, where Petecof was crowned both rookies' and series champion.

FIA Formula 2 Championship 

It was announced in early February that he would join Campos for the 2021 FIA F2 Championship. He lined up alongside Ralph Boschung. In June, he left the team citing financial reasons.

Formula One
In December 2017 Ferrari added Petecof to their Driver Academy. In January 2021, Petecof announced he had left the academy.

Stock Car Brasil 
Petecof is due to join Stock Car Brasil in 2022 with Full Time Sports. He will partner ex-Formula 1 race winner Rubens Barrichello.

Racing record

Career summary

Complete Italian F4 Championship results 
(key) (Races in bold indicate pole position) (Races in italics indicate fastest lap)

Complete ADAC Formula 4 Championship results
(key) (Races in bold indicate pole position) (Races in italics indicate fastest lap)

Complete Formula Regional European Championship results
(key) (Races in bold indicate pole position) (Races in italics indicate fastest lap)

Complete FIA Formula 2 Championship results 
(key) (Races in bold indicate pole position) (Races in italics indicate points for the fastest lap of top ten finishers)

Complete Stock Car Brasil results
(key) (Races in bold indicate pole position) (Races in italics indicate fastest lap)

References

External links
 

2002 births
Living people
Racing drivers from São Paulo
ADAC Formula 4 drivers
Italian F4 Championship drivers
Formula Regional European Championship drivers
FIA Formula 2 Championship drivers
Prema Powerteam drivers
Campos Racing drivers
KIC Motorsport drivers
Stock Car Brasil drivers
Karting World Championship drivers